Vranov is a municipality and village in Benešov District in the Central Bohemian Region of the Czech Republic. It has about 400 inhabitants.

Administrative parts
Villages and hamlets of Bezděkov, Bučina, Doubravice 2.díl, Klokočná, Mačovice, Naháč, Údolnice and Vranovská Lhota are administrative parts of Vranov.

Geography
It lies in the Benešov Uplands. There is a system of ponds supplied by the Drhlavský Brook.

History
The first written mention of Vranov is from 1352, when it was a parish village.

Transport
The D1 motorway from Prague to Brno passes through the northeastern part of the municipality.

Sights
The landmark of Vranov is the Church of Saint Wenceslaus. The most valuable part is the sacristy with an apse, which was preserved from the original pre-Romanesque church from the 11th century. The church was rebuilt in the Baroque style in the 18th century, when the tower added. Neobaroque modifications were made in 1905.

References

External links

Villages in Benešov District